Resolution is the sixth EP by Australian musician Matt Corby, released on 12 July 2013 by Universal Music Australia.

Sales of the EP counted towards the single, which peaked at number 5 on the ARIA Charts.

Critical reception
Donald Gibson from Write on Music said the EP "commands attention and deserves an audience. Singing with extraordinary range and resilience, Corby steers between moments of serene, often melancholic introspection and ones of urgent, primal anguish." Gibson called out "Evangelist" as the "most invigorating song of the bunch".

Track listing

References

2013 EPs
Matt Corby albums